Antero Lumme (1934 – 11 October 2016) was a Finnish racing cyclist. He won the Finnish national road race title four consecutive times between 1962 and 1965.

References

External links

1934 births
2016 deaths
Finnish male cyclists
Place of birth missing